Donnabel Cuya Ravanes (born July 15, 1975), better known as Viveika Ravanes, is a Filipino actress, singer and comedian. Currently, she is a talent of ABS-CBN. She is known for playing the role of Sabel in the hit daytime show Be Careful with My Heart.

Filmography

Television

External links

Living people
1975 births
Star Magic
People from Pasig
ABS-CBN personalities
TV5 (Philippine TV network) personalities